USS Halcyon (SP-518) was a United States Navy patrol vessel in commission from 1917 to 1919. She saw service during World War I and its immediate aftermath. After the conclusion of her naval service, she was in the United States Bureau of Fisheries fleet as the research vessel USFS Halcyon from 1919 to 1927.

Construction and characteristics

After receiving an appropriation of US$45,000 from the United States Congress for the construction of a ship for use along the coast of Maine, the U.S. Bureau of Fisheries (BOF) awarded a contract for US$44,217 to the Townsend Marine Railway and Construction Company at Boothbay Harbor, Maine. Designed both to support the fish hatchery at the BOF's Boothbay Harbor station and to conduct oceanographic and fisheries science research, the ship, named USFS Halcyon, was launched on 30 November 1916 and completed and accepted by the BOF on 3 May 1917. Crew quarters were below decks, as were water tanks and equipment for transporting live fishes. She had a  steam engine, an Almy boiler, and a single screw.

Operational history

U.S. Navy
While Halcyon was under construction, the United States entered World War I on 6 April 1917. As a result, before Halycon could begin her intended fisheries service, the Bureau of Fisheries transferred her to the United States Navy on 14 May 1917 for war service. The Navy commissioned her the same day at Boston, Massachusetts, as USS Halcyon (SP-518), the first U.S. Navy ship of the name. Assigned to the section patrol in the 1st Naval District in northern New England, Halcyon performed harbor patrol duties for the remainder of World War I and in its immediate aftermath. The Navy decommissioned her on 24 June 1919, struck her from the Navy List on 31 July 1919, and transferred her back to the Bureau of Fisheries on 5 August 1919.

U.S. Bureau of Fisheries

The Bureau of Fisheries reported that the Navy transferred Halcyon back in good condition, but also that she was not fully complete or equipped at the time of her 1917 transfer to the Navy and that she needed additional work before she was ready for BOF service. This included the removal of a heavy gun platform the Navy had installed on her forward deck, an overhaul of her engine and other machinery, interior alterations, and the installation of bilge keels, electric lighting, and a dredging winch.

Finally ready for fishery service, USFS Halcyon made her first scientific cruise in August 1920; conducted at the request of fishing interests in Massachusetts, the cruise covered  of fishing grounds in the Gulf of Maine and to the south and southwest of the South Shoal Lightship in an unsuccessful attempt to locate schools of mackerel. Based at the BOF's Boothbay Harbor station from July to October 1921, she underwent an overhaul in July and August 1921. With it completed, she made a  cruise between Nantucket, Massachusetts, Browns Bank, and Yarmouth, Nova Scotia, Canada, to collect bottom samples in support of a hydrographic survey of the Gulf of Maine.

In October 1921, Halcyons home port changed to the BOF station at Woods Hole, Massachusetts. She towed the BOF vessel USFS Widgeon from Woods Hole to Hampton Roads, Virginia, arriving there on 25 November 1921.

During March and April 1922, Halcyon was at Newport, Rhode Island, spending little time at sea but conducting work in support of flatfish studies by the Woods Hole station. During August and September 1922, her crew overhauled the BOF fishery patrol vessel .

In February 1923, Halycon provided valuable service in keeping channels open through ice in the harbors of Gloucester, Manchester-by-the-Sea, and Salem, Massachusetts, and from April through June 1923, she tagged codfish near Nantucket. By 30 June 1923, she had steamed  over the preceding year.

During fiscal year 1924, which ran from 1 July 1923 to 30 June 1924, Halcyon again tagged codfish during the summer months. She also used drift bottles to study currents on  lines running offshore from Mount Desert and Cape Elizabeth, Maine, and Cape Ann and Cape Cod, Massachusetts, and conducted two short cruises to observe water temperatures in Massachusetts Bay.

During fiscal year 1925 (1 July 1924–30 June 1925), Halcyon steamed . Although she devoted the winter of 1924–1925 to fish-culture work in support of the BOF fish hatchery at Gloucester, Massachusetts, she spent much of the rest of the fiscal year investigating fisheries in the Gulf of Maine, operating from Nantucket Shoals to Mount Desert, Maine. Most of her work during the fiscal year involved tagging cod, haddock, and pollack to gain data on their migrations, and her crew and embarked scientists tagged 16,000 fish during the fiscal year. However, she also made some temperature observations and collected shore fishes.

She interrupted this work in February 1926 to visit Portsmouth Navy Yard in Kittery, Maine, where her crew reconditioned the newly acquired BOF research vessel .

Fiscal year 1926 turned out to be Halcyons last year of active BOF service. By the time Albatross II began operating for the BOF in August 1926, taking up Halcyons former duties in and around the Gulf of Maine, the BOF had laid up Halcyon. Deeming her to be "well built" but of "peculiar design" and no longer suited to BOF requirements, the BOF condemned and sold her in November 1927.

Notes

References 

World War I patrol vessels of the United States
Patrol vessels of the United States Navy
Ships built in Boothbay Harbor, Maine
Ships of the United States Bureau of Fisheries
1916 ships